Oatgrass is a common name for several plants and may refer to:

Arrhenatherum, oatgrass
Avenula, oatgrass
Danthonia californica, California oatgrass
Trisetum, oatgrass
Oats, young plants of which may be referred to as "oat grass"